Happiness? is the third solo album by English musician Roger Taylor, best known as the drummer for the band Queen. It was his first album outside of Queen since releasing Blue Rock with The Cross in September 1991.

Recording
Writing of Roger Taylor's material spanned way before initial recording in 1993. Taylor, like his other bandmates, was mourning the death of lead singer, Freddie Mercury. Recording mostly took place in his home studio over the final months of 1993 to the beginning of 1994. Halfway through recording, Taylor collaborated with Japanese musician, Yoshiki. The result of the collaboration was the track "Foreign Sand".

The album was released on what would have been Mercury's 48th birthday.

Controversy
Although released as a single, the lyrics of the track "Nazis 1994", attacking neo-Nazism, were deemed so controversial that it was banned by UK commercial radio stations. Additionally, it was banned from being advertised and many record stores refused to stock the single. Ironically, the publicity aided in the album's success.

Track listing
All songs written by Roger Taylor, except "Foreign Sand" written by Taylor and Yoshiki.

"Nazis 1994" – 2:35
"Happiness" – 3:17
"Revelations" – 3:44
"Touch the Sky" – 5:04
"Foreign Sand" – 6:53
"Freedom Train" – 6:12
"‘You Had to Be There’" – 2:55
"The Key" – 4:25
"Everybody Hurts Sometime" – 2:52
"Loneliness..." – 2:25
"Dear Mr Murdoch" – 4:19
"Old Friends" – 3:33

Personnel
All tracks except Foreign Sand:
Roger Taylor: Drums, Vocals and Guitars
Jason Falloon: Guitars
Phil Spalding: Bass
Mike Crossley: Piano and keyboards
Catherine Porter: Backing Vocals
Josh Macrae: Programming

Foreign Sand:
Yoshiki: Arrangement, Drums, Piano and Synthesizer.
Roger Taylor: Vocals
Jim Cregan: Guitars
Phil Chen: Bass
Dick Marx: Strings Arrangement
Brad Buxer and Geoff Grace: Programming
Mastered by Chris Blair at Abbey Road 
Album Design by Roger Taylor and Richard Gray

Singles
"Nazis 1994" - (UK No. 22)

"Foreign Sand"- (UK No. 26)

"Happiness?" - (UK No. 32)

References
Happiness Liner Notes@ http://www.queenpicturehall.com/albums/r03h.shtml

1994 albums
Roger Taylor (Queen drummer) albums
Albums produced by Roger Taylor (Queen drummer)
Parlophone albums
EMI Records albums